Irena Vassileva Peeva is a professor of mathematics at Cornell University, specializing in commutative algebra. She disproved the Eisenbud–Goto regularity conjecture jointly with Jason McCullough.

Education and career
Peeva did her graduate studies at Brandeis University, earning a Ph.D. in 1995 under the supervision of David Eisenbud with a thesis entitled Free Resolutions. She was a postdoctoral researcher at the University of California, Berkeley and a C. L. E. Moore instructor at the Massachusetts Institute of Technology
before joining the Cornell Department of Mathematics faculty in 1998.

Peeva is an editor of the Transactions of AMS.

Books
Peeva is the author of:
 Graded Syzygies (Springer, 2011).
 Minimal Free Resolutions over Complete Intersections (with David Eisenbud, Springer, 2016).

Recognition
In 2014 Peeva was elected as a fellow of the American Mathematical Society "for contributions to commutative algebra and its applications."

In 2019/2020 and in 2012/2013 Peeva was a Simons Foundation Fellow. During 1999-2001 she was a Sloan Foundation Fellow and was a Sloan Doctoral Dissertation Fellow in 1994/1995.

References

External links
Home page at Cornell University
Irena Peeva in the Oberwolfach photo collection

Year of birth missing (living people)
Living people
20th-century American mathematicians
21st-century American mathematicians
American women mathematicians
Brandeis University alumni
Massachusetts Institute of Technology School of Science faculty
Cornell University faculty
Fellows of the American Mathematical Society
20th-century women mathematicians
21st-century women mathematicians
Algebraists
21st-century American women